Fifty-seven navigational stars and additionally the star Polaris are given a special status in the field of celestial navigation. Of the approximately 6,000 stars visible to the naked eye under optimal conditions, these selected stars are among the brightest and span 38 constellations of the celestial sphere from the declination of −70° to +89°. Many of the selected stars were named in antiquity by the Babylonians, Greeks, Romans, and Arabs.

The star Polaris, often called either the "Pole Star" or the "North Star", is treated specially due to its proximity to the north celestial pole. When navigating in the Northern Hemisphere, a simple and quick technique can be used with Polaris to determine the observers latitude or, for larger maritime vessels can be used to calculate any gyrocompass error that may exist. The other 57 selected stars have daily positions given in nautical almanacs, aiding the navigator in efficiently performing observations on them. A second group of 115 "tabulated stars" can also be used for celestial navigation, but are often less familiar to the navigator and require extra calculations.

Although Polaris can quickly and simply give a solution for latitude in the northern hemisphere, it can not participate in giving a position fix including longitude - it is for this reason it is excluded from the list of 57 primary navigational stars, each of which can be used to produce (in conjunction with each other, known time in relation to the prime meridian and a set of sight reduction tables) an actual latitudinal and longitudinal positional fix.

For purposes of identification, the positions of navigational stars — expressed as declination and sidereal hour angle — are often rounded to the nearest degree.  In addition to tables, star charts provide an aid to the navigator in identifying the navigational stars, showing constellations, relative positions, and brightness.

In practical use for sight reductions whilst at sea, tables can further assist a navigator by giving approximate altitudes (angles above the horizon) and azimuths (degrees as read from the compass) from an assumed or estimated position, usually helping to quickly determine the location and then quickly identify a particular navigational star that may be useful for a sight reduction.

Background

Under optimal conditions, approximately 6,000 stars are visible to the naked eye of an observer on Earth.  Of these, 58 stars are known in the field of navigational astronomy as "selected stars", including 19 stars of the first magnitude, 38 stars of the second magnitude, and Polaris.  The selection of the stars is made by Her Majesty's Nautical Almanac Office and the US Naval Observatory, in the production of the yearly Nautical Almanac which the two organizations have published jointly since 1958. Criteria in the choice of stars includes their distribution across the celestial sphere, brightness, and ease of identification. Information for another 115 stars, known as "tabulated stars", is also available to the navigator. This list provides information on the name, approximate position in the celestial sphere, and apparent magnitude of the 58 selected stars in tabular form and by star charts.

These stars are typically used in two ways by the navigator. The first is to obtain a line of position by use of a sextant observation and the techniques of celestial navigation.  Multiple lines of position can be intersected to obtain a position known as a celestial fix. The second typical use of the navigational stars is to determine gyrocompass error by computing the azimuth of a star and comparing it to an azimuth measured using the ship's gyrocompass. Numerous other applications also exist.

Navigators typically refer to stars using one of two naming systems for stars: common names and Bayer's designations. All of the selected stars have had a common name since 1953, and many were named in antiquity by the Arabs, Greeks, Romans, and Babylonians. Bayer's naming convention has been in use since 1603, and consists of a Greek letter combined with the possessive form of the star's constellation. Both names are shown for each star in the tables and charts below.

Each star's approximate position on the celestial sphere is given using the equatorial coordinate system. The celestial sphere is an imaginary globe of infinite size with the Earth at its center. Positions on the celestial sphere are often expressed using two coordinates: declination and sidereal hour angle, which are similar to latitude and longitude on the surface of the Earth. To define declination, the Earth's equator is projected out to the celestial sphere to construct the celestial equator, and declination is measured in degrees north or south of this celestial equator. Sidereal hour angle is a measurement between 0° and 360°, indicating how far west a body is from an arbitrarily chosen point on the celestial sphere called the First Point of Aries.  Note that right ascension, as used by astronomers, is 360° minus the sidereal hour angle.

The final characteristic provided in the tables and star charts is the star's brightness, expressed in terms of apparent magnitude. Magnitude is a logarithmic scale of brightness, designed so that a body of one magnitude is approximately 2.512 times brighter than a body of the next magnitude. Thus, a body of magnitude 1 is 2.5125, or 100 times brighter than a body of magnitude 6. The dimmest stars that can be seen through a 200-inch terrestrial telescope are of the 20th magnitude, and very bright objects like the Sun and a full Moon have magnitudes of −26.7 and −12.6 respectively.

Table

The table of navigational stars provides several types of information.  In the first column is the identifying index number, followed by the common name, the Bayer designation, and the etymology of the common name.  Then the star's approximate position, suitable for identification purposes, is given in terms of declination and sidereal hour angle, followed by the star's magnitude.  The final column presents citations to the sources of the data,  The American Practical Navigator and the star's entry at the SIMBAD database, a project of the Strasbourg Astronomical Data Center or CDS.

Star charts

Navigators often use star charts to identify a star by its position relative to other stars.  References like the Nautical Almanac and The American Practical Navigator provide four star charts, covering different portions of the celestial sphere.  Two of these charts are azimuthal equidistant projections of the north and south poles.  The other two cover the equatorial region of the celestial sphere, from the declination of 30° south to 30° north. The two equatorial charts are mercator projections, one for the eastern hemisphere of the celestial sphere and one for the western hemisphere.  Note that unlike familiar maps, east is shown to the left and west is shown to the right.  With this orientation, the navigator can hold the star chart overhead, and the arrangement of the stars on the chart will resemble the stars in the sky.
 
In the star charts, constellations are labelled with capital letters and indicated by dotted lines collecting their stars.  The 58 selected stars for navigation are shown in blue and labelled with their common name, star number, and a Greek letter to indicate their Bayer designation.  The additional 115 tabulated stars that can also be used for navigation are shown in red and labelled with a Greek letter to indicate their Bayer designation.  Some additional stars not suitable for navigation are also included on the charts to indicate constellations, they are presented as unlabelled small red dots.

Equatorial stars
 
 Equatorial stars of the eastern hemisphere
The equatorial region of the celestial sphere's eastern hemisphere includes 17 navigational stars from Alpheratz in the constellation Andromeda to Denebola in Leo.  It also includes stars from the constellations Cetus, Aries, Taurus, Orion, Canis Major and Minor, Gemini, and Hydra.  Of particular note among these stars are "the dog star" Sirius, the brightest star in the sky, and four stars of the easily identified constellation Orion. 

 
 Equatorial stars of the western hemisphere
The equatorial region of the celestial sphere's western hemisphere includes 13 navigational stars from Gienah in the constellation Corvus to Markab in Pegasus.  It also includes stars from the constellations Virgo, Bootes, Libra, Corona Borealis, Scorpio, Ophiuchus, Sagittarius, and Aquila.  The variable star Arcturus is the brightest star in this group.

Northern stars

The 11 northern stars are those with a declination between 30° north and 90° north.  They are listed in order of decreasing sidereal hour angle, or from the vernal equinox westward across the sky.  Starting with Schedar in the constellation Cassiopeia, the list includes stars from the constellations Auriga, the Great and Little Bears, Draco, Lyra and Cygnus.  The two brightest northern stars are Vega and Capella.

In the star chart to the right, declination is shown by the radial coordinate, starting at 90° north in the center and decreasing to 30° north at the outer edge.  Sidereal hour angle is shown as the angular coordinate, starting at 0° at the left of the chart, and increasing counter-clockwise.

Southern stars

The 18 southern stars are those with a declination between 30° south and 90° south.  They are listed in order of decreasing sidereal hour angle, or from the vernal equinox westward across the sky.  Starting with Ankaa in the constellation Phoenix, the list includes stars from the constellations Eridanus, Carina, Crux, Centaurus, Libra, Triangulum Australe, Scorpio, Sagittarius, Pavo, and Grus.  Canopus, Rigil Kentaurus, Achernar, and Hadar are the brightest stars in the southern sky.

In the star chart to the right, declination is shown by the radial coordinate, starting at 90° south in the center and decreasing to 30° south at the outer edge.  Sidereal hour angle is shown as the angular coordinate, starting at 0° at the right of the chart, and increasing clockwise.

Footnotes
 Notes

 Citations

References

Stars
Navigation
Navigation